Cape Dezhnyov or Cape Dezhnev, formerly known as East Cape or Cape Vostochny, is a cape that forms the easternmost mainland point of Asia. It is located on the Chukchi Peninsula in the very sparsely populated Chukotka Autonomous Okrug of Russia. The Diomede Islands and Fairway Rock are located in the midst of the strait.

Geography
In 1898, the cape was officially renamed as Cape Dezhnev, replacing Captain James Cook's name, the "East Cape". It was named in honor of Semyon Dezhnev, the first recorded European to round its tip (in 1648). There is a large monument to Dezhnev on the seacoast.

That low-lying land is so low in elevation that the cape appears as an island from a distance far to the south of it. The headland and the neck of low-lying land together form a peninsula. A well-established trail crossed the neck of land behind the headland in pre-historic and historic times, traversed by sleds in the winter and used as a portage in the summer to avoid traversing the strait. This route was important enough that, according to an analysis by linguist Michael Krauss, the Central Siberian Yupik language continued up the coast, un-interrupted by the Naukansky dialect spoken in the village of Naukan on the headland.

History

The Cape Dezhnev peninsula, (or East Cape, as it was then generally called) was a center for trade between American (and other) whalers and the fur traders and the native Yupik and Chukchi people of the coast in the late 19th and early 20th centuries. In the early years, ships would call at Uelen to trade for furs produced along the arctic coast. Subsequently, there were established trading stations at Uelen and Deshnevo (Chukchi name Keniskun; Yupik Kaniskak). When a source of that period speaks of stopping or trading at East Cape, either of these locations may be meant, or occasionally the Yupik village Naukan on the southeast shore of the cape, which had less trade because it lacked a good anchorage.  Sources from that period sometimes speak of a village Emma-Town. Although this name may be derived from the nearby Yupik village Enmitahin (Chukchi for "end of the cliff") the name appears to refer to Keniskun (where the traders were) or perhaps to both villages together. Of the four historical villages on the cape itself, only Uelen is still inhabited. Naukan was evacuated in 1958 with most of the occupants relocated to Nunyamo near Saint Lawrence Bay, Chukotka, and Keniskun was merged with Uelen a little earlier.

In Josef Bauer's As Far as My Feet Will Carry Me (1955), Cape Deshnev is given as the site of a Gulag lead-mine camp from which a German POW Clemens Forell (actual name: Cornelius Rost) escaped in 1949. Later research cast serious doubt on the book's accuracy. For example,  at the time of the escape described, no Cape Dezhnev Gulag camp lead mine existed.

Gallery

See also
Extreme points of Russia
East Siberian Mountains

References

General references
 .
 Bockstoce, John R. (2009) Furs and Frontiers in the Far North: The Contest Among Native and Foreign Nations for the Bering Strait Fur Trade The Lamar Series in Western History, Yale University Press, 
 
 Crow, John, Anastasia Yarzuktina, and Oksana Kolomiets "American traders and the native people of Chukotka in the early 20th Century" 2010 International Conference on Russian America, Sitka, AK August 18–22.
 Fisher, Raymond H. (ed) (1981) The Voyage of Semen Dezhnev in 1648: Bering's precursor, with selected documents.  Hakluyt Society, London.
 Hodge, Frederick Webb (1912) Handbook of American Indians North of Mexico: A-M Volume 30 of Bulletin (Smithsonian Institution. Bureau of American Ethnology).  Part 1 of Handbook of American Indians North of Mexico. (Hodge placed Enmitahin north of East Cape, contrary to the location on the USCGS chart. He reports 48 residents in 8 houses, c. 1895, citing Bogoras).
 Krauss, Michael E. (2005) Eskimo languages in Asia, 1791 on, and the Wrangel Island-Point Hope connection Études/Inuit/Studies, vol. 29 (1-2), 2005, pp 163–185.
 Krupnik, Igor and Mikhail Chlenov (2007). "The end of 'Eskimo land': Yupik relocation in Chukotka, 1958-1959" Études/Inuit/Studies 31 (1-2) pp 59–81.
  Query Bering; select preview for year wanted.  Click desired location to enlarge and center.
 
 Rasmussen, Knud. Across Arctic America: Narrative of the Fifth Thule Expedition. New York: G. P. Putnam's Sons, 1927. Scanned, illustrated, at Internet Archive.
 
 United States Hydrographic Office (1909). Asiatic pilot, Volume 1. Issues 122-126; Issue 162 of H.O. pub. Gov. Printing Off., Washington.

External links

 Cape Dezhnev east of Uelen, showing a Chukchi umiak paddling out to meet the steamer Corwin
 View of Uelen summer 1907
 Trading post at Dezhnevo, late 1920s

Landforms of the Bering Sea
Dezhnyov
Pacific Coast of Russia
Extreme points of Earth
Bering Strait